Relhania garnotii is a shrublet belonging to the daisy family (Compositae or Asteraceae), indigenous to the southern Overberg region of the Western Cape Province, South Africa.

Description 
Relhania garnotii is a small shrublet, with short, ericoid leaves and flowerheads composed in terminal cymes.

Distribution
It is endemic to the Overberg region of the Western Cape Province, South Africa, where it occurs on silcrete, but also in flat, coastal sandy or clay Renosterveld vegetation, between the towns of Bredasdorp and Mossel Bay.

References 

Endemic flora of South Africa
Relhania garnotii
Renosterveld